Vatti Vasant Kumar (1955 – 29 January 2023) was an Indian politician. A member of the YSR Congress Party, he served in the Andhra Pradesh Legislative Assembly from 2004 to 2014.

Vasant Kumar died in Visakhapatnam on 29 January 2023, at the age of 67.

References

1955 births
2023 deaths
YSR Congress Party politicians
People from West Godavari district
Andhra University alumni
Andhra Pradesh MLAs 2004–2009
Andhra Pradesh MLAs 2009–2014